Iván Abreu (La Habana, 1967, naturalized Mexican citizen) Abreu's received his degree in Informational Design from the Superior Design Institute of La Habana and took the master's degree of Engineering Information Technology at the Anáhuac University. Abreu's work has been written about in ["(ready)Media. Hacia una arquitectura de los medios y la investigación en México"], "The visual artbeat" and "CódigoDF". His work is included in public and private collections as FEMSA; Patronato del Centro Histórico, Casa Vecina; Televisa and Museo Extremeño e Iberoamericano de Arte Contemporáneo. He currently holds the grant awarded by the Sistema Nacional de Creadores de Arte of FONCA (2016–2019) and has received grants and support by 2012 ThePrix Ars Electronica (Linz, Austria); the CINTAS Foundation Award in Visual Arts, Sistema Nacional de Creadores de Arte of FONCA (2012–2014), 2011–2012 and the Program for research in Arts and Media at the National Center for the Arts (2007).

Statement 
His work integrates different processes of art, design and technology; based on the synergy of these disciplines he uses a broad range of media such as drawing, photography, artistic installation, electronic devices, software development, sound experimentation, Internet and industrial design. His work is founded in the creation of artistic gestures that demonstrate a hypothesis to the public that proofs and perpetuates a fact, a strategy that he calls "The poetics of demonstration". Under this criteria he has created a body of work which poeticizes and produces situations of exception linked to physical and social phenomena: Ice which surface contains sound recordings with historical content (anthems and political speeches), dead birds that continue suspended on air by magnetic levitation, collaboration and balance dynamics at the border between Ciudad Juárez (MX) and El Paso (US) using an instrument or carpenter's level. Projects seeking new tensions between the object, the space, the specificity of the place, and language, to activate critical thinking and the desire of the possible.

Selected works 
 Multiple vortex tornado (2013)
The installation could be summarized with the notion that, as a visitor leafs through the pages of a book, he finds himself in the middle of a tornado. For this, a special book stand was designed with a sensor which registers the draft of the air that occurs while one flips through the pages. While leafing through the book the visitor can interactively create the acoustic illusion of a tornado, as the sensor is controlled by software developed by the artist, and the output is fed to several speakers spread throughout the room. Thus this art work can create a situation that not only provides an audio-visual experience, but also a transformation of the architectonic space itself. The concept of generating a tornado is dedicated, through the distortion of norms, more to the idea of creating consciousness of space, and less to the idea of producing a reevaluation of the ambient air. The sound installation, which "enacts" the wind of a tornado, effects a minimal gesture that changes the appearance and the experience of the space. The artist has reinterpreted the everyday act of leafing through a book so that the book, normally known simply as a container for text, can itself become responsible for a tangible, narrative event.

 The flip of the conductor (2012–13) 
The flip of the conductor is an installation that consists of a modified conductor's music stand and seven books of different weights and sizes. Those books were designed in order to generate different sounds when the public activated them on the music stand by flipping the pages. The place where the installation was located produced two strong effects in the visitors: the experience of becoming the conductor of an unknown sound and the feeling of embracing of a surround sound. The project was exhibited also in Museo del juguete antiguo de México, as part of the commemoration of the 100th anniversary of the publishing of the art of the noises of Luigi Russolo. This was performed as a live act although with different sounds from the one exhibited in CENART. The characteristics of the event bounded the project to generate a new experience for the public in a live act. So, this time, as part of the experimentations of the artist with factors such as the intensity and the rhythm, each book had a specific sound that was recognized and repeated with the turn of each page. Two elements were relevant in the selection of the books: their physical features and their content. The whole selection is in one way or another, connected to the ideas and principles contained in the Futurist Manifesto. The selected books were: Theory of Bloom (Tiqqun),  Art and Society in Industrial Times (William Morris), The Rest Is Noise (Alex Ross), The Viewer's Dialectic (Tomás Gutiérrez Alea), Historia de las artes gráficas (Alfonso Salazar Rovirosa), Understanding Comics (Scott McCloud) and Anthologie du cinéma invisible (Christian Janicot).

 Climate agent (2012) 
Interactive installation with a black book that, when flipping the pages generates the air that makes the Mexican flag wave. The flag was an animation displayed on the wall so, the installation worked with a sensor of movement which changed the image displayed. The FILIJ selected this project, because of the materials of the piece and the invitation to think and reframe some national notions in an electoral year.

 Cross Coordinates (Ciudad Juárez MX | El Paso US, 2010–2011) http://us.crosscoordinates.mx 
Residents of El Paso and Ciudad Juárez were filmed when they played a game of cooperation by balancing a specially designed carpenter's level, as a gesture of the delicate balance of life on the border and a reflection of political will in the cooperation and the balance between the involved parts. The gallery visitors played with the same carpenter's level, accumulating meters of cooperation in order to achieve the goal of exceed the length of the MX-US border (3,169,000m), and to construct an aesthetic-political gesture of balance and collaboration possibility between two cities, countries or points of view. The website works like the project´s open documentation, allowing to see, share and think, expanding the documentation and generating support gestures and sensitivity to the border´s problematic. Project commissioned by the Rubin Center of the University of Texas at El Paso.

 Segundo Aire (Second wind, 2010)
Four dead birds remain in the air by electronic devices of magnetic levitation. Next to them, drawings with the flow of the magnetic field to visualize the invisible forces that make hang up in the air possible.

 Apnea (2010) 
Apnea was a kinetic installation located in the air vents of the Bellas Artes station of the Mexico City Metro. In this installation, 900 propellers reacted and turned at any air movement of the subway station. Besides, each propeller had a Twitter account, that generated tweets registering the last time they turn, so, this time between breaths were their periods of apnea. The design of the propellers is as particular as the location of the installation. These artifacts are made of an acrylic piece, two magnets, bicycle spokes and plastic propeller.

 High Tide (Pleamar, 2009)
Installation synchronized with Singapore's coastal-tide. This project uses buoys that previously were taken to the sea between Singapore and Malaysia until the salt residue marked the flotation level. The buoys, once suspended in the gallery conserve the tide level of the water and their movement was based on an electronic device that predicts second to second the tide in adjustment with the date, the present hour and the table of tides previously published by the port of Singapore. The rhythm of the buoys swaying in the installation corresponds to the tide oscillation, that is extremely slow, almost imperceptible, and only noticeable if we observed the piece at different moments of the day.

 Final Abierto (Open Ending, 2009)
12 inches vinyl disc redesigned like chronometer needles were the hands of five particular clocks that indicated the days, hours, minutes, seconds and hundredth of second. The needles were of the end of the disc or dead wax. The central label was only a reference of the disc used. The speed of the hand of the clock produces subtle sound combinations every hundredth of second, second, minute, hourly or once a day. That way, the installation becomes an endless sound-time accumulator.
The installation becomes an endless sound-time accumulator.

 23.90mts (2009) 
23.90 meters is the calculated length of a short wave antenna to synchronize 5960 khz, the NHK International Japanese Radio frequency for Central America and part of the North between 9:00 and 10:00 pm. The 23.90 meters of the aluminium installation functioned as a short wave antenna, which rescue and return the japanese language to a trolleybus through the NHK International Japanese Radio for Central America. The sound installation produces a simultaneous bond with the japanese language and activating the exhibition place's memory in a trolleybus donated by Japan to Mexico City in the year 2000.
To build the antenna-installation, parts of three aluminium tubular chairs were taken apart and reused. With the new chairs geometry, a line of 23.90 meters was obtained. When two short wave radios were connected, the radio station broadcast from Tokyo could be received.

 Signal Mirrors (Espejos de señal, 2008) 
Construction of live landscape to blur a city's mountainous topography: in a mountainous city several people kilometers away from each other and in the same topographic height produced a horizontal gesture making sparkles with signal mirrors. The collaboration was requested tof inhabitants whose houses were marked under an extensive imaginary horizontal trace, that the natural landscape of the city does not have. During the action, a group of art students made signals (sparkles), from houses located in the horizontal outline with signal mirrors designed specifically for the project. The action lasted four hours and was recorded in video and photographs.

 M(R.P.M.) Mass according to revolutions per minute (2007–2011) 
m(r.p.m.) is a live action and the result of an investigation: transfer historical sound recording it to "ice vinyls". The ice vinyls are played back while they transform and disappear because of the vinyls' melting. These ice vinyls are played live during the short time that the ever-changing characteristic of the disc allows the process, in which the surface with the grooves turning to liquid, disappearing the sound recordings and emerging noise and experimentation. This time depends and is related to the climate and the space conditions: temperature, humidity, wind; being the reason why it varies in each live act. Ice vinyls are made with molds that contain the negative information of the original disc grooves. Water is spilled on these molds and they are put away to freeze the necessary time to obtain solid copies. In front of the public the disc is separated from the mold and played.

Exhibitions and other works 
His work has been exhibited at: Palazzo delle Arti Napoli or PAN (Italy, 2009), the School of Art, Design and Media of the NTU, (Singapore, 2009), Museum Universitario de Arte Contemporáneo [MUAC] (Mexico, 2009), Experimental Museum El Eco, (Mexico, 2008), MEIAC Extremeño and Museo Iberoamericano of Contemporary Art (Spain, 2008), Centro Cultural Fronterizo (Mexico, 2008), Ex-Teresa Arte Actual Museum (Mexico, 2007, 2006), Cultural Center of Spain in Buenos Aires (Argentina, 2005), National Center for the Arts. (Mexico, 2006, 2005), Media Art Festival: BigBlip05. (England, 2005), Museum Conde Duque (Spain, 2005), Museo Rufino Tamayo (Mexico, 2004, 2003), Alameda Art Laboratory (Mexico, 2003), Ogaki Museum (Japan, 2003), Wifredo Lam Center (Cuba, 2001, 2000), Kiehl Visual Arts Center, Minnesota (USA, 1999), Konstfack Gallery (Sweden, 1997), Development Center Visual Arts (Cuba, 1996).

He has also dedicated himself to being director of the International Festival. Transitio_Mx (2005 and 2007), he is founder and director of Medios y Tecnología, Center for Design, Film and Television (2004 to 2006). Counsellor and director of The National Fund for Culture and the Arts (2004 to 2006) and advisor to dorkbot of Mexico City (2006–present).

Awards 
He has obtained various awards and supports for his work as: Program. for research in Arts and Media at the National Center for the Arts (2007), Goethe Institute (2005), The Foundation for Contemporary Art (Torre de la Winds, 2003), First International Audi Award for the interactive project (2002) ), winner of the National Union of Writers and Artists of Cuba (1991).

First prize in poster without precedents in the National Hall of Graphics. Havana, Cuba (1991), 2012 The Ars Electronica Award (Linz, Austria): Interactive Art | Honorable Mention: Crossed Coordinates (MX-US); CINTAS Foundation Award 2011-2012 in Visual Arts, Art and Media Research Program of the National Arts Center (2007)

He is a beneficiary of the National System of Art Creators of the National Fund for Culture and the Arts of Mexico (2012-2014).

References

External links
Iván Abreu at Greusslich-Contemporary
Iván Abreu at Cintas Foundation
Iván Abreu at Laboratorio de Arte Alameda
Iván Abreu at Prix Ars

Living people
Mexican artists
1967 births
Cuban emigrants to Mexico